Pontefract Collieries Football Club is a semi-professional football club based in Pontefract, West Yorkshire, England. The club is affiliated to the West Riding County Football Association and Castleford & District Football Association. Founded in 1958 and nicknamed 'The Colls', they have traditional local rivalries with neighbours Glasshoughton Welfare, Hemsworth Miners Welfare and Selby Town. More recently, a rivalry has developed with Ossett United, including a promotion play-off at the end of the 2018–19 season.

Ground

Pontefract Collieries play their home games Beechnut Lane, situated near to the site of the former Prince of Wales Colliery.

The ground is fully floodlit with a capacity of approximately 1,200 spectators and comprises hard standing area around the perimeter of the pitch. One stand behind the goals has a terrace with cover. The main stand holds the seating provision, with the seats obtained from  Manchester City's old Maine Road ground when it was demolished.

Recent history

2012–13 
The season ended with only one defeat in the last ten games including victories over Askern Villa of 9–0 and 10–2. The club finished 5th for the third season in a row.

2013–14 
This was a season of consolidation which ended in a disappointing 9th place but with a clear plan in place for the 2014–15 season.

2014–15 
The plan was delivered as The Colls finished as runners-up in North Counties East League Division One and were promoted back to the NCEL Premier Division after a 15 year absence. Along the way they recorded the highest away win, best aggregate score, most goals scored (joint with Louth Town), 2nd best defense and the most clean sheets.

2015–16 
The latter part of the season saw the Colls with a new management team of Craig Parry, Manager and former Colls Keeper, assisted by Craig Rouse and Nigel Danby. The Colls fought to the bitter end but ended up third from bottom and back in Division One.

2016–17 
A great start to the season led by Manager Craig Parry, Assistant Manager Craig Rouse and Head Player/Coach Luke Jeffs saw the Colls win 9 from 9 (including pre-season friendlies) The League performance saw some brilliant runs of form including one of 21 games with only one defeat. With the Colls fate in their own hands they only needed to win away at Worsborough Bridge in the final game. This they duly did and returned to the NCEL Premier Division at the first time of asking.

2018–19 
After two consecutive promotions the Colls had an extremely successful first ever season at Step Four of non-league in the NPL Division One East finishing as runners-up to Morpeth Town. A good pre-season saw the Colls gain 2 pieces of silverware – The Bill Cook Memorial Trophy against Glasshoughton Welfare and the Inaugural Colliery Cup from a keenly contested game against NPL Division One West side Atherton Collieries. The Colls narrowly lost out on promotion to the NPL Premier Division at the first time of asking after losing to Brighouse Town in the Play-offs.

2019–20 
A successful pre-season saw the Colls again retain the Bill Cook Memorial Trophy against Glasshoughton Welfare (winning 9–2) and also retain the Colliery Cup against the 2018–19 NPL Division One West champions Atherton Collieries (winning 6–1).

Honours

Northern Counties East League
Premier Division champions 2017–18
Division One North champions 1983–84
Floodlit Cup winners 1987–88, 1988–89
Wilkinson Sword Trophy winners 1995–96
Yorkshire Football League
Division Three champions 1981–82
Castleford & District FA Embleton Cup
Winners 1982–83, 1986–87, 1995–96, 1999–00, 2005–06, 2006–07, 2007–08

Squad

References

External links

Official website

Football clubs in England
Football clubs in West Yorkshire
Association football clubs established in 1958
1958 establishments in England
Sport in Pontefract
West Yorkshire Association Football League
Yorkshire Football League
Northern Counties East Football League
Northern Premier League clubs
Mining association football teams in England